Hecker is a surname. Notable people with the surname include:

 Chris Hecker, American video game programmer
 Ewald Hecker (1843-1909), German psychiatrist, originator of the concept of hebephrenia
  (1879-1954), German industrialist and Nazi SS-Brigadeführer
 Florian Hecker (born 1975), German electronic musician, publishing mostly on Vienna's Mego label
 Friedrich Hecker (1811-1881), German Forty-Eighter and veteran of the American Civil War
 Isaac Thomas Hecker (1818-1889), Roman Catholic priest, founder of the Paulist Fathers
 Jakob Hecker  (1887-1969), German painter
 Jan Hecker (1967-2021), German lawyer and diplomat
 Johann Julius Hecker (1707-1768), a German educator who established the Berlin Realschule
 Justus Hecker (1795-1850), German medical historian
 Max Hecker (born 1879), Austrian-born Israeli President of the Technion – Israel Institute of Technology
 Maximilian Hecker (born 1977), German pop musician, publishing mostly on Berlin's Kitty-Yo label
 Robert Hecker (born 1965), guitarist for California punk band, Redd Kross
 Scott Hecker, sound editor
 Siegfried Hecker (born 1943), Director of Los Alamos National Laboratory, professor at Stanford University
 Tim Hecker (born 1974), Canadian electronic musician, known as Jetone

See also
 Johnny Hekker (1990-) NFL punter
 Kimm Hekker (1957-) Dutch singer
 George Hekkers (1923-2008) NFL tackle

German-language surnames